Xinghe may refer to:

Xinghe County, a county in Inner Mongolia, China
Xinghe, Shaanxi (杏河), a town in Zhidan County, Shaanxi, China
Xinghe Korean Ethnic Township (兴和朝鲜族乡), a township in Suihua, Heilongjiang, China
Xinghe (興和, 539–542), era name used by Emperor Xiaojing of Eastern Wei